Franz Reitz (28 January 1929 – 10 June 2011) was a German racing cyclist. He won the German National Road Race in 1957.

References

External links
 

1929 births
2011 deaths
German male cyclists
Sportspeople from Wiesbaden
German cycling road race champions
Cyclists from Hesse
20th-century German people